Pollack may refer to:
 Pollack (surname), a surname (and list of people with the name)
 Pollack (fish) or pollock 
 Pollack (card game), a German card game resembling Tresette
 Pollack (Martian crater)
 Sei whale or pollack whale

See also 
 Polack (disambiguation)
 Pollack's rule, a rule about microprocessor performance
 Pollock (disambiguation)